The 2022 Winter Olympics torch relay was run from 18 October 2021 until 4 February 2022. After it was lit in Olympia, Greece, the torch traveled in a symbolic relay to Athens on 19 October. The Chinese leg ended in Beijing National Stadium, at the end of the opening ceremony. On 20 October 2021, it was announced that the Chinese leg will have only three days, starting on 2 February, at the morning of the first day of the Chinese New Year as stage 3. Unlike the previous relays, the relay only visited the three venues clusters, the main sights of Beijing and the city of Zhangjiakou. The final torch was lit by long-distance runner Dilnigar Ilhamjan (Dinige'er Yilamujiang) and nordic combined Zhao Jiawen.

Relay
Activists staged a protest at the Olympic torch lighting ceremony in Greece.

The choice to have Qi Fabao, a People's Liberation Army commander famous for his participation in the 2020–2021 China–India skirmishes, be a torchbearer has been controversial with India launching a diplomatic boycott of the games as a result.

Route in Greece

Route in China

Flame display leg (stage 1)

Online flame leg (stage 2)

Beijing municipal leg (stage 3)

End of Torch Relay

The relay ended after the 2022 Winter Olympics opening ceremony, when the Olympic Cauldron was lit by Altay Uyghur cross-country skier Dilnigar Ilhamjan, and nordic combined Zhao Jiawen.
 
After the cauldron in the stadium was lit, the three venues clusters' cauldron was lit right after the end of the opening ceremony.
Taizicheng venues cluster - cauldron located at its central plaza. It was lit by the 19 y.o. free/slopestyle skier Wang Wenzhuo (王文卓) from Zhangjiakou.
Yanqing venues cluster - permanent cauldron located in downtown Yanqing away from the fire-restricted venues. It was lit by the 10 y.o. short track speed skater Wang Hanyi (王瀚一) from Yanqing, who ranked first place in  500m event at Beijing municipal short track championships.
Beijing venues cluster - cauldron located between the Nation Stadium and the Ice Cube. It was lit by Zhang Junying (张军英), an architect and former olympic cycling racer,she was among the group of designers of the National Stadium project and a volunteer of the 2022 Winter Olympics.

References

Torch Relay
Olympic torch relays